James Meyer Sassoon, Baron Sassoon,  (born 11 September 1955) is a British businessman and politician. After a career in the financial sector he served in various roles in HM Treasury, the UK's finance ministry, from 2002 to 2008, at which point he began advising David Cameron on financial issues. From May 2010 to January 2013, Sassoon was the first Commercial Secretary to the Treasury and was appointed to the House of Lords as a Conservative. In January 2013, he became an executive director of Jardine Matheson Holdings and of Matheson & Co. He is also a director of Hongkong Land, Dairy Farm and Mandarin Oriental and chairman of the China-Britain Business Council.

In November 2017 he was mentioned in the Paradise Papers as one of the beneficiaries of a tax exempt Cayman Island trust fund worth $236 million in 2007 and defended it as being of non UK origin. Sassoon was president of the international Financial Action Task Force on Money Laundering 2007–2008.

Early life and education
Sassoon is a member of the Sassoon family, and was born in London, the son of Hugh Meyer Sassoon (first cousin of Siegfried Sassoon) and Marion (née Schiff); he is the great-great grandson of Sassoon David Sassoon.

He was educated at Sunningdale School, a junior boarding independent school in the village of Sunningdale in Berkshire, where he was a friend of David Profumo, the son of John Profumo. Thereafter he attended Eton College, a senior boarding school, also in Berkshire, followed by Christ Church at the University of Oxford, where he read Philosophy, Politics and Economics.

Career

Finance
In 1977 Sassoon began his career in finance at Thomson McLintock & Company. In 1985, he joined S.G. Warburg & Co. (later UBS Warburg). He became a director in 1995, leading the firm's privatisation business, and from 2000 to 2002 he served as vice-chairman of investment banking.

Sassoon served as a director of the following organisations: Partnerships UK, 2002–06; Merchants Trust, 2006–10 (chairman 2010); the ifs School of Finance, 2009–10 (chairman) and the Nuclear Liabilities Fund, 2008–2010. 
He was a trustee of the National Gallery Trust, 2002–09 and of the British Museum, 2009–10 and 2013–present. 
Since 2013 he has been a member of the global advisory board of Mitsubishi UFJ Financial Group. In January 2013, he became an executive director of Jardine Matheson Holdings and of Matheson & Co. He is also a director of Hongkong Land, Dairy Farm International Holdings and Mandarin Oriental and chairman of the China-Britain Business Council.

Government and politics

In 2002, he joined HM Treasury, becoming managing director of finance, regulation and industry, and served until 2006. Sassoon then became the chancellor's representative for promotion of the city. In 2007, he was named president of the Financial Action Task Force on Money Laundering, also responsible for combating terrorism financing. He continued in both roles until 2008. Sassoon received a knighthood in the 2008 New Year Honours. At that time, he began advising David Cameron, then the Leader of the Opposition, and George Osborne, then the Shadow Chancellor of the Exchequer, and became a member of the Shadow Cabinet's Economic Recovery Committee.

In 2009, he wrote The Tripartite Review, a review of the adequacy of the UK's three financial regulators (the Financial Services Authority, HM Treasury and the Bank of England), especially as regards financial stability.

In May 2010, he was named Commercial Secretary to the Treasury, a minister whose portfolio includes financial services and business. In consequence, it was announced he would be made a life peer, and on 3 June 2010 he was introduced in the House of Lords as Baron Sassoon, of Ashley Park in the County of Surrey.

In the 2012 Cabinet reshuffle it was announced he would be replaced by Lord Deighton in January 2013 as Commercial Secretary to the Treasury and in line with Sassoon's desire to return to the private sector.

In November 2017, he was mentioned in the Paradise Papers as one of the beneficiaries of a tax exempt Cayman Island trust fund worth $236 million in 2007, and defended its assets as being of non-UK origin contributed only by his grandmother, who had died more than 40 years prior.

Personal life
In 1981, Sassoon married Sarah Barnes, daughter of the former ambassador to Israel and the Netherlands, Sir Ernest John Ward Barnes and Lady Cynthia Barnes of Hurstpierpoint. They have a son and two daughters.

Arms

References

Who's Who 2011

External links

1955 births
Living people
Alumni of Christ Church, Oxford
British businesspeople
British Jews
Conservative Party (UK) life peers
Knights Bachelor
People educated at Eton College
People educated at Sunningdale School
James
Jewish British politicians
People named in the Paradise Papers
British people of Indian-Jewish descent
Baghdadi Jews
British politicians of Indian descent
British businesspeople of Indian descent
Life peers created by Elizabeth II